Sasikala or Shashikala may refer to:

 V. K. Sasikala (born 1957), Indian businesswoman and politician
 Sasikala (actress) (born 1965), Indian film actress
 Sasikala Pushpa (born 1976), Indian politician

Feminine given names